Sizwe Motaung (7 January 1970 – 16 August 2001) was a South African football player who played for Jomo Cosmos, Mamelodi Sundowns, St. Gallen, CD Tenerife, Kaizer Chiefs and Orlando Pirates, as well at international level for the national side. He was part of the squad that won the 1996 African Cup of Nations.

He died of an AIDS-related disease at his home in Newcastle on 16 August 2001, at the age of 31.

References

External links
Player profile at FIFA

1970 births
2001 deaths
South African soccer players
South Africa international soccer players
South African expatriate soccer players
Association football defenders
Kaizer Chiefs F.C. players
Orlando Pirates F.C. players
People from Newcastle, KwaZulu-Natal
FC St. Gallen players
CD Tenerife players
Jomo Cosmos F.C. players
Expatriate footballers in Switzerland
Expatriate footballers in Spain
South African expatriate sportspeople in Switzerland
South African expatriate sportspeople in Spain
La Liga players
1996 African Cup of Nations players
AIDS-related deaths in South Africa
Soccer players from KwaZulu-Natal